Millersburg Military Institute (MMI) was a military boarding school founded in 1893 in Millersburg, Kentucky, about  northeast of Lexington, Kentucky. It closed in 2014.

History 

Founded in 1893, it survived for over 113 years until closing in July 2006 due to a declining student population. The school had been temporarily closed in 2003, but was reopened by a rally of support from alumni and parents.

The property is bounded to the northwest by KY-68, to the southeast by railroad tracks and open land, and to the north and south by residential properties. The school was founded in 1893 on the property of the former Kentucky Wesleyan College and moved to its current location in 1920. Upwards of 250 students were enrolled during the school's peak operating times; however, class sizes steadily declined through the early 2000s, resulting in the school's closure in 2006.

The U.S. Army Cadet Corps purchased the property in September 2008 and turned it into its national headquarters, as well as a National Cadet Training Center. The facility served again as a military boarding school as Forest Hill Military Academy starting in August 2012. In 2014, the U.S. Army Cadet Corps began a reorganization and closed the school.

It was announced in September 2015 that the grounds will once again be auctioned leaving the future of the school uncertain. The school filed for bankruptcy and stopped the sale and attempted the restructuring of its debt. However, the restructuring efforts were ultimately unsuccessful and Forest Hill Military Academy went back into bankruptcy and its campus was foreclosed in 2016.

Notable alumni
 Wendell Berry (born 1934) – academic, cultural and economic critic, farmer and prolific author of novels, short stories, poems, and essays
 Tom Boerwinkle (born 1945) – basketball player at the University of Tennessee and with the NBA Chicago Bulls (1968–1978)
 Jason Conley (born 1981) – attended for one postgraduate year before attending Virginia Military Institute; he would become the first freshman to lead NCAA Division I men's basketball in scoring

References

External links
Millersburg Military Institute
Millersburg Military Institute at Abandoned

Military high schools in the United States
Schools in Bourbon County, Kentucky
Educational institutions established in 1893
1893 establishments in Kentucky
2014 disestablishments in Kentucky
Educational institutions disestablished in 2014